Jan Bidovec (born 17 October 1989) is a Slovenian épée fencer.

Biography

Bidovec started fencing in the fencing club Tabor Ljubljana. He later moved to Zurich, Switzerland to pursue medical studies and trained in the Akademischer Fechtclub Zürich. He currently trains in the Fechtklub Bern and works as a Surgery Resident in Spital Thun. He competes in international tournaments since 2006.

He reached the final table of 32 at the 2012 European Championships in Legnano, where he stumbled against Spain's Elias Casado. In the 2013–14 season he won the Belgrade satellite tournament. He also qualified for the final table of 64 in the 2014 World Championships in Kazan, but he lost by a single hit to 1988 Olympic bronze medallist José Luis Abajo.

References

External links
 Profile at the European Fencing Confederation
 bio

Slovenian male épée fencers
1989 births
Living people
Slovenian emigrants to Switzerland
Sportspeople from Zürich